Ron Miller may refer to:

Ron Miller (pole vaulter) (1929–2010), Canadian pole vaulter
Ron W. Miller (1933–2019), American businessman, son-in-law of Walt Disney and CEO and president of Walt Disney Productions in the 1970s and 80s
Ronald H. Miller (1938–2011), American author and a professor of religion at Lake Forest College
Ron Miller (American football) (born 1939), American football player
Ron Miller (artist and author) (born 1947), science fiction illustrator and writer, and administrator of the Bonestell Space Art
Ron Miller (Pennsylvania politician) (born 1951), American politician from Pennsylvania
Ronald F. Miller (born 1954), American politician and state senator in West Virginia
Ron Miller (songwriter) (1932–2007), composer of such popular songs as "For Once In My Life" and "Yester Me, Yester You, Yester Day"
Ronald Miller, Scottish geographer, president of the Royal Scottish Geographical Society, 1974–1977

See also
Ron Millar, computer game designer
Ronald Millar (1919–1998), English actor, writer and dramatist